Phillip Bruggisser (born 7 August 1991) is a Danish professional ice hockey defenceman. He currently plays with Fischtown Pinguins of the Deutsche Eishockey Liga (DEL).

Bruggisser was named to the Denmark men's national ice hockey team for the 2014 IIHF World Championship.

Career statistics

Regular season and playoffs

International

References

External links
 

1991 births
Living people
Almtuna IS players
Danish ice hockey defencemen
EfB Ishockey players
Fischtown Pinguins players
Grizzlys Wolfsburg players
EC KAC players
Krefeld Pinguine players
Rødovre Mighty Bulls players
IF Sundsvall Hockey players
Ice hockey players at the 2022 Winter Olympics
Olympic ice hockey players of Denmark
People from Rødovre
Sportspeople from the Capital Region of Denmark